Shamil Bank was a Bahrain-based Islamic retail bank licensed and regulated by the Central Bank of Bahrain, with commercial and investment banking activities. It has grown steadily to become one of Bahrain's leading financial institutions.

Shamil Bank provides a diverse range of products and services that cater to the financing and investment needs of individuals and institutions. Conducting its business in compliance with the principles of Sharia’a, it operates a network of local branches and maintains a presence in overseas markets through its subsidiaries, associated and affiliated companies. In 2007, the bank has become a wholly owned subsidiary of Ithmaar Bank BSC, a full-service investment bank, and in 2010, it has been merged into its parent company.

See also

Dar Al-Maal Al-Islami Trust
List of banks in Bahrain

References

External links
Shamil Bank of Bahrain

1982 establishments in Bahrain
Banks established in 1982
Banks of Bahrain
Companies listed on the Bahrain Bourse
Investment banks
2010 mergers and acquisitions
Companies based in Manama